Library instruction, also called bibliographic instruction, user education and library orientation, consists of "instructional programs designed to teach library users how to locate the information they need quickly and effectively.  [It] usually covers the library's system of organizing materials, the structure of the literature of the field, research methodologies appropriate to the academic discipline, and specific resources and finding tools (library catalog, indexes and abstracting services, bibliographic databases, etc.)" It prepares individuals to make immediate and lifelong use of information effectively by teaching the concepts and logic of information access and evaluation, and by fostering information independence and critical thinking. Above all they are aimed at equipping library users with skills to locate library sources and use them effectively to satisfy their information needs.

History
Library instruction "began in the nineteenth century, with instruction in library use offered by a number of libraries in the United States between 1876 and 1910, and then ramped up in the early twentieth century". In 1880, Justin Winsor, president of the American Library Association (ALA), redefined the role of the librarian as also a teacher. In a 1912 ALA survey, 57% of respondents offered required or elective library instruction courses.

"Academic library instruction was for the most part dormant in the library profession from the late 1930s until the early 1960s. Some librarians were still participating in classroom instruction but the literature shows little activity on the topic.... Academic library instruction mushroomed during the 1960s and early 1970s. This resulted in the founding of the Library Orientation Exchange (LOEX), a non-profit, self-supporting educational clearinghouse, in the early 1970s. The first conference was held at Eastern Michigan in 1973 and has been held annually around the United States ever since. The LOEX borrowing collection consists of print materials such as one page handouts, bibliographies, and subject guides; instructional videos and audio tapes; and CD-ROMS. By 1999, LOEX had over 650 members in the United States, Canada, the Caribbean, Europe, Australia, Israel, Lebanon, and South Africa."

"During the 1970s and 1980s, prior to widespread public use of computers, [library instruction] went far beyond teaching the mechanics of identifying and locating materials in the physical library.  It also included critical thinking, active (participatory) learning, and the teaching of concepts, such as controlled vocabularies.  It focused on the physical library, as for the most part, that was all that users could try out during instruction.  However, the goal was always  teaching so that users would transfer what they learned to new situations, reference tools, and environments new to them—that is, they would learn how to learn." In research libraries, the bibliographic instruction started to be a mainstream and standard library service. Library instruction pioneer Miriam Sue Dudley's library instruction materials, originally produced in 1970 for a Chicano student group at UCLA, are an example of such materials now available online.

Library instruction is evolving to adapt to the changing concepts of information use and understanding. Model programs, in order to be meaningful and effective, should respond to the changing information environment. New methods of library instruction, such as the Cephalonian method, reflect changes in instructional technology and education theory.   Information and communication technology literacy (ICT) is an example of a modern approach to library instruction.
ICT extends information literacy to the use of computer technology in a variety of forms to manipulate, deliver, and receive information and ideas. A model library instruction program utilizes complementary tools and resources to deliver memorable, interactive instruction. These resources are necessary to engage the attention of contemporary patrons immersed in a media environment.

Relationship to information literacy
According to the Presidential Committee on Information Literacy, Information literacy is the set of skills a person needs to be "able to recognize when information is needed and the ability to locate, evaluate, and use effectively the needed information." In an academic setting, instruction in information literacy can take on a variety of forms, such as a long class or a project integrated into a course on related subject matter. Literacy competency standards are outlined by the Association of college and Research Libraries.

Currently there are debates about whether instruction on how to use library systems is necessary, or if efforts are better spent making systems easier to use so that they require no instruction. A particular study published in the Journal of Academic Librarianship indicates that the most predominant model of teaching information literacy, the one-shot session model, is ineffective and doesn't really make a perceptible difference in the grades of the students. However the same study also indicated that students who attended a longer class with a library instruction session scored significantly higher, indicating that it may not be the idea of the instruction that is flawed, but rather the method.

Formats
Library instruction "occurs in various forms such as formal class settings, small group sessions, one-on-one encounters, written guides and brochures, audiovisual presentations, and computer-assisted instruction (CAI)".

"Course-related instruction has long been viewed as one of the most effective user education methods. A complication of course-related instruction, however, is the requirement for faculty cooperation and the faculty member's authority to decide when instruction is given and who receives it. In short, librarians have limited control over course-related instruction. These forms of instruction are also very staff-intensive, and this is exacerbated by the high ratio of students to librarians that exists in most institutions".

Some university libraries offer specialized instructional sessions.  At these sessions the librarian works one-on-one with a user to assist him or her with specific research goals. These sessions are sometimes referred to as a "term paper clinic" or a "research consultation."

Another option for library instruction consists of one-shot instruction sessions.  This slang term refers to "formal instruction given in a single session, as opposed to instruction extended over two or more sessions". These class meetings are often held just before a term paper is assigned, and the goal of the librarian is to orient the class to the best library sources for use in a term paper.

After 2015, webinars began to be part of the library instruction programs. During the 2020-2021 COVID-19 pandemic, this form of teaching became the norm for university libraries around the world.

Library instruction can also benefit from the utilization of video games and gaming designed for information literacy. When incorporating design principles from gaming into information literacy instruction, instructional librarians can teach students how to succeed through long, complex, and difficult tasks while still keeping the learning experience engaging. Library instruction and active learning information literacy workshops can also be facilitated by theater techniques, by the rules of hospitality or by humor.

Critical library instruction  
Critical library instruction is rooted in the idea that knowledge is culturally situated, and thus, instruction must be as well. Characterized by a praxis-based approach that is deeply connected to the context and information needs of the learner, critical library instruction always begins with an assessment of the learner's context and their information needs.  Critical library instruction problematizes traditional methods of teaching information literacy skills as privileging particular ways of knowing in academic contexts, and instead advocates a method of teaching that emphasizes the learner's frame of reference and information needs.

Influenced by critical pedagogy, an educational philosophy that address problems and questions of particular relevance to the lives of students, critical library instruction aims to provide the same approach to students’ information needs and practices. From critical literacy, critical library instruction approaches literacy as political and literacy instruction as a political act; thus, critical library instruction requires instructors to maintain awareness of power dynamics, identity intersections, and to challenge their own definitions of literacy in order to provide meaningful instruction to their particular students.

See also
 CRAAP test
 Information cycle
 Information literacy
 Cephalonian method

Notes

References
 Bishop, W. W. (1912). Training in the use of books. Sewanee review, 20 (July), pp. 265–81.
 Davis, R. C. (1886). Teaching bibliography in colleges. Library journal, 11 (September), pp. 289–94.
 Hopkins, F. L. (1982). A century of bibliographic instruction: The historic claim to professional and academic legitimacy. College and research libraries, 43 (May), pp. 192–98.
 Lorenzen, M.  (2003).  Encouraging community in library instruction: A jigsaw experiment in a university library skills classroom.  Illinois Libraries 85(1): 5–14.

External links
Library Instruction Wiki
Library Instruction.Com
LOEX Clearinghouse for Library Instruction

Library resources